Thomas W. Dempsey (born January 23, 1931 in Williamsport, Pennsylvania) is a former Republican member of the Pennsylvania House of Representatives.

He graduated from Williamsport High School in Lycoming County, Pennsylvania in 1948 and from Lycoming College in 1952. He was elected to represent the 83rd legislative district in November 1987, following the death of fellow Republican Anthony J. Cimini, a position he held until his retirement prior to the 2000 elections.

In 2001, he received the Angela R. Kyte Outstanding Alumnus Award from Lycoming College

References

External links
 official PA House profile (archived)

Living people
1931 births
Lycoming College alumni
Politicians from Williamsport, Pennsylvania
Republican Party members of the Pennsylvania House of Representatives